The 2017–18 season was the club's fourth season since its establishment in 2014 and their fourth season in the Indian Super League.

Season overview

Pre-season 
FC Goa announced on 24 April signing of nine players for their development squad but only six names were revealed. Aaren D'Silva and Derren Fernandes were signed from Santa Cruz Club of Cavelossim, Princeton Rebello from Vasco. Liston Colaco signed from Salgaocar F.C. for the transfer fee of  Million. Ivon Costa and Jude Cardozo from local Goan clubs.

June 
On 5 June 2017, FC Goa announced Sergio Lobera as their new manager replacing Zico on a 2-year contract. On 16 June 2017, FC Goa announced the return of Bruno Pinheiro.

July 
FC Goa retained goalkeeper Laxmikant Kattimani and midfielder Mandar Rao Desai from their last season's squad before the players draft. Both players signed three-year deal and will stay with the franchise until 2020. On 12 July, Manuel Arana signed for FC Goa on 1-year contract. On 18 July, FC Goa announced signing of Spanish forward Ferran Corominas on 1-year deal who last played for Cypriot side Doxa Katokopias.

In ISL players draft held on 23 July 2017, FC Goa retained midfielder Pratesh Shirodkar. Franchise added ten new players from draft, goalkeeper Bruno Colaco and Naveen Kumar, defender Chinglensana Singh, Amey Ranawade and Mohamed Ali, midfielder Brandon Fernandes, Anthony D'Souza, Seriton Fernandes, Jovel Martins and Mohammed Yasir. Defender Narayan Das and midfielder Pronay Halder made their comebacks. Five players from FC Goa were signed by other clubs in the draft. Defender Keenan Almeida and Fulganco Cardozo were signed by Chennaiyin. Midfielder Sahil Tavora was signed by Mumbai City. Midfielder Romeo Fernandes was signed by Delhi Dynamos and forward Robin Singh was signed by ATK. I-League side Mohun Bagan signed defender Debabrata Roy outside draft.

FC Goa announced signing of Indian striker Manvir Singh on 28 July 2017.

August 
On 2 August, Moroccan midfielder Ahmed Jahouh was signed from FUS Rabat on a year long loan deal. On 14 August 2017, former FC Barcelona B player Sergio Juste signed for FC Goa. On 23 August 2017, Manuel Lanzarote signed for FC Goa from Real Zaragoza.

September 
On 1 September 2017, FC Goa completed the signings of two foreign players Edu Bedia and Adrian Colunga. It was announced that Goa would have their pre-season in Murcia, Spain with a 27-man squad and play five friendly matches in Spain.

October 
FC Goa had a strong pre-season after they played a total of five friendlies in Spain; winning three and losing two matches. They returned to Goa on 27 October 2017.

November 
FC Goa continued their preparations for the new season by playing three friendlies in Goa, they won two and lost one out of three matches. They ended their pre-season with a 4–0 victory over Chennai City.

FC Goa kicked off their Indian Super League season by beating Chennaiyin away 2–3. On 25 November 2017, Goa lost their first match of the season against Mumbai City 1–2. On 30 November 2017, Goa won their first home match 4–3 against Bengaluru as Ferran Corominas scored the first hat-trick of the 2017–18 Indian Super League.

December 
FC Goa continued their good form after winning 5–2 against Kerala Blasters as Corominas scored his second consecutive hat-trick of the season. On 17 December, Goa beat Delhi Dynamos in a 1–5 away victory, sending them at the top of the table. FC Goa lost their first home match of the season against Pune City in a 0–2 loss.

January 
On 3 January 2018, FC Goa drew their first game of the calendar year with a 1–1 away draw against ATK, the match was delayed by 2 hours and 45 minutes due to unavoidable circumstances at Goa Airport which caused the team travel late. Three days later, Goa lost their third match in the league against NorthEast United in a 2–1 away loss, this loss left them winless in three games. On 10 January, Goa announced the signing of winger Lalmuankima from Aiwzal FC, they also signed U-19 goalkeeper Mohammad Nawaz who would join their development team. On 11 January, Goa defeated Jamshedpur in a 2–1 home victory as Lanzarote scored a brace, this was their first win of the calendar year 2018. On 21 January, Goa beat Kerala Blasters in a 1–2 away victory with goals from Ferran Corominas and Edu Bedia. On 24 January, Mohamed Ali and Brandon Fernandes signed new contracts with FC Goa which would keep them at the club until 2020. On 26 January, Goa announced the signing of Mark Sifneos until the end of the season. On 28 February, Goa lost to Mumbai City 3–4 at home with Seriton Fernandes receiving two yellow cards and sent off. On 31 January, Goa announced that Manuel Arana would be sent on loan to Delhi Dynamos until the end of the season.

February 
On 2 February, Goa announced the signing of Hugo Boumous following the departure Manuel Arana. Two days later, Goa drew 2–2 at home against NorthEast United. On 9 February, Goa suffered a 2–0 away defeat to Bengaluru. On 15 February, Goa lost 0–1 to Chennaiyin at home. On 21 February, Goa drew 1–1 with Delhi Dynamos at home which meant they were winless in five games. Goa then bounced back and went on to win 0–4 away vs Pune City and 5–1 at home vs ATK.

March 
On 4 March, Goa won 0–3 away against Jamshedpur. They qualified for the playoffs and finished third in the group. After picking up a 1–1 draw in the first leg of the semi-final against Chennaiyin, they lost 0–3 in the second leg away from home and got knocked out. They directly qualified for the 2018 Super Cup after finishing in the top six of the Indian Super League table. On 24 March, FC Goa announced on Twitter that assistant coach Derrick Pereira would take charge as head coach for the Super Cup in Sergio Lobera's absence.

April 
On 3 April, Goa beat ATK 3–1 in the round of 16 of the Super Cup. On 12 April, Goa beat Jamshedpur 1–5 in the quarter-finals of the Super Cup, Goa players; Sergio Juste, Brandon Fernandes and Bruno Pinheiro and Jamshedpur players; Subrata Pal, Anas Edathodika and Kervens Belfort were sent off at the start of the second half. On 16 April, Goa were knocked out after East Bengal beat Goa 1–0 in the semi-finals of the Super Cup.

Pre Season Friendlies

Transfers

In

Out

Loan in

Loan out

Squad

Current Technical Staff

Competitions

Indian Super League

Standings

Results summary

Results by round

Matches

Playoffs

Semi-finals

Super Cup

Round of 16

Quarter-finals

Semi-finals

Player statistics

List of squad players, including number of appearances by competition

|-
! colspan=14 style=background:#dcdcdc; text-align:center|Goalkeepers

|-
! colspan=14 style=background:#dcdcdc; text-align:center|Defenders

|-
! colspan=14 style=background:#dcdcdc; text-align:center|Midfielders

|-
! colspan=14 style=background:#dcdcdc; text-align:center|Forwards

 
|-
! colspan=14 style=background:#dcdcdc; text-align:center| Players who have made an appearance or had a squad number this season but have left the club

|-
|}

Goalscorers 

 Last updated: 16 April 2018

Hat-tricks

Clean sheets

Disciplinary record 

Updated: 16 April 2018

Notes

References

External links

FC Goa seasons
Goa